Yuriy Danilovich, also known as Georgiy Danilovich (Юрий Данилович in Russian) (1281 – 21 November 1325) was Prince of Moscow (1303–1325) and Grand Prince of Vladimir (from 1318).

Yury was the oldest son of Daniel, the first prince of Moscow. His first official action was to defend Pereslavl-Zalessky against Grand Duke Andrew III. Upon Andrew's death the next year, Yury had to contend the title of Grand Duke of Vladimir with Mikhail of Tver. While the Tverian army besieged Pereslavl and Moscow itself, Mikhail went to the Golden Horde, where the Khan elevated him to the supreme position among Russian princes.

In the meantime, Yury arranged the murder of Prince Konstantin of Ryazan. This unlucky ruler had been captured by Yury's father back in 1302 and had been incarcerated in Moscow since then. While Ryazan was shocked by such a barbarity, Yury annexed the key Ryazanian fortress of Kolomna to Moscow Duchy. He also captured Mozhaisk, which formerly belonged to the princes of Smolensk. By 1314, Yury secured backing from the Metropolitan Peter and formed an alliance with Novgorod against Tver. Now, he felt strong enough to challenge Mikhail of Tver in the Horde.

In 1315, Yury went to the Golden Horde and, after spending two years there, constructed an alliance with Uzbeg Khan. Upon Yury's marriage to the khan's sister Konchaka, Uzbeg Khan deposed Mikhail and nominated Yury as the Grand Duke of Vladimir. Back in Russia with a large force of Mongols, Yury approached Tver. However, Yuri's army was defeated and his brother Boris and his wife were taken prisoners. Thereupon he fled to Novgorod and sued for peace. At that time his wife, still held in Tver as a hostage, died unexpectedly. Yury availed himself of the confusion that followed and announced to the khan that she had been poisoned on Mikhail's order. The khan summoned both princes to Sarai and, after a trial, had Mikhail executed.

Yury returned to Russia, hated by other princes and populace alike, in 1319. He was now entrusted with the task of gathering all-Russian tribute to the Horde. But Mikhail's son and successor, Dmitry the Terrible Eyes, still opposed him. In 1322, Dmitry, seeking revenge for his father's murder, went to Sarai and persuaded the khan that Yury had appropriated a large portion of the tribute due to the Horde. Yury was summoned to the Horde for a trial but, before any formal investigation, was killed by Dmitry. Eight months later, Dmitry was also executed in the Horde.

Shortly before his death, Yury led the army of Novgorod to fight the Swedes and founded a fort in the mouth of the Neva River. Upon signing the Treaty of Orekhovo in 1323, Yury continued eastward and conquered Velikiy Ustyug the same year.

See also
 Bibliography of Russian history (1223–1613)
 Rulers of Russia family tree

References

1281 births
1325 deaths
14th-century Grand Princes of Moscow
14th-century murdered monarchs
13th-century princes in Kievan Rus'
14th-century Russian princes
Grand Princes of Vladimir
Murdered Russian monarchs
Rurik dynasty
Eastern Orthodox monarchs